Jinzhou District is one of the seven districts of Dalian, Liaoning province, People's Republic of China. Recently, it is again a thriving town, having Dalian Development Area within its area as well as becoming a bedroom community to downtown Dalian.

History

Before Russia coerced a lease of the Lüshun Naval Port from the Qing dynasty and established Dalian as a commercial port in 1898, Jinzhou was the center of this region, a thriving walled town, to which the central government official was dispatched to rule this region.

 Three Kingdoms
 A revolt in Liaodong Peninsula (239 A.D.)
 Tang, Song and Yuan Dynasties
 Emperor Li Shimin (Emperor Taizong of Tang) and his army campaigned against Goguryeu and captured the Bisa (Beisha) fortification, on Dahei Mountain, Jinzhou (645).
 Government official was sent to a town which was renamed Jinzhou (1218)
 Ming Dynasty
 Qing Dynasty
 Japan occupied Liaodong Peninsula including Jinzhou during the Sino-Japanese War and tried to lease it (1894), but returned it as the results of the Triple Intervention by France, Germany and Russia, with Russia swiftly coercing a lease soon afterwards.
 Japan re-occupied Liaodong Peninsula during the Russo-Japanese War (1904) and leases it as Kwantung Leased Territory (1905)
 Republic of China
 Japan's lease agreement was extended to 99 years, until 1999 (1915)
 The Soviet forces advanced to Jinzhou and the Communist Party-led Jinzhou Prefectural Government was established (1945)
 People's Republic of China
 Jinzhou became part of Lüda City (旅大市) (1950)
 After becoming part of Liaonan Special Zone (1966), Jinzhou was returned to Lüda City (1969), which was later renamed as Dalian City (1981)

Recently, it is again a thriving District, having Dalian Development Area within it as well as becoming a bedroom community to downtown Dalian.

Geography 
 1074.6 square kilometers of land
 20 kilometers northeast of the downtown Dalian
 Pulandian District to the north, Ganjingzi District to the south, the Yellow Sea to the east and the Bohai Sea to the west
 Highest point: Dahei Mountain, 662 meters above sea level
 In winter, the Yellow Sea side of Jinzhou District does not freeze, but the Bohai Sea side freezes in January and February

Administrative divisions

There are 25 subdistricts within the district.

Subdistricts:

Climate

Transportation

 Jinzhou Railway Station on the Dalian-Shenyang-Harbin Railway (former South Manchurian Railway)
 Dalian-Shenyang-Harbin and Dalian-Dandong-Shenyang Expressways
 Dalian Railway Station-Dalian Development Area-Golden Pebble Beach (Line 3 of Dalian Metro)

Education

Colleges and Universities
 Dalian University
 Dalian Minzu University

International schools
 Dalian Maple Leaf International School
 Dalian Korean International School (KO)
 Dalian American International School

Sightseeing

 Xiangying Square and Stalin Road for Pedestrians only
 Former government official's office
 Jinzhou Museum, newly built in north of the town
 Longwang Taoist Temple, Jinzhou Christian Church, etc.
 South Hills, a Russo-Japanese war battleground
 Dahei Mountain

Dalian Development Area
 Cannon Hills, East Mountain Park, Kailun International Hot Spring Club, etc.

Golden Pebble Beach (Jinshitan) Tourist Area
 Golden Pebble Beach Golf Course, Discovery Kingdom, etc.

Eight Views of Old Jinzhou

The Eight Views of Old Jinzhou are:
 Shengshui Temple (Buddhist, Dahei Mountain)
 Xiangshui Temple (Taoist, Dahei Mountain)
 Chaoyang Temple (Buddhist, Dahei Mountain)
 Beisha Castle (Dahei Mountain)
 Yuhuang Temple (Taoist)
 Diaojingtai
 Longwang Temple (Taoist)
 Mengzhen Cave

See also

 Dalian Development Area
 Dalian
 Liaoning Province
 Battle of Nanshan
 Jinzhou Museum (Dalian)

References

External links
 Jinzhou District home page
 Jinzhou New District Tourism Administration Official Website

Districts of Dalian